The Battle of Ujjain took place on 18 July 1801 near Ujjain between the rival factions of the Maratha empire.

In July 1801, Maharaja Yashwantrao Holkar attacked Sindhia's capital Ujjain, and after defeating Sindhia's army led by John Hessing, extorted a large sum from its inhabitants, but did not ravage the town.  In this war nearly 3,000 soldiers of Sindhia's army were killed. The Holkar's victory was an embarrassing defeat for the Sindhia.

Citations

Sources
 

Ujjain
History of Madhya Pradesh
Ujjain
History of Ujjain